The World Soundtrack Awards, launched in 2001 by the Film Fest Gent, is aimed at organizing and overseeing the educational, cultural and professional aspects of the art of film music, including the preservation of the history of the soundtrack and its worldwide promotion. The event takes place yearly in Ghent, Belgium with the ceremony usually at the Capitole Concert Hall. Usually, the Brussels Philharmonic conducted by Dirk Brossé performs the awarded music at the ceremony.

Main Awards
The three main categories are:
Film Composer of the Year
Television Composer of the Year
Best Original Song Written Directly for a Film

Other awards
Discovery of the Year
Public Choice Award (2001–2002, 2004–)
Lifetime Achievement Award
Sabam Award for the Most Original Composition by a Young International Composer
Major Contribution to the Art of Film Music and Sound (handed out occasionally)
Most Creative Use of Existing Material on a Soundtrack (2001)
Best Original Score of the Year Not Released on an Album (2001)
Best Original Film Score of the Year
Best Original Score for a Belgian Production

Background
Brussels Philharmonic conducted by maestro Dirk Brossé performs fragments from several scores during the awards ceremony at the Kuipke in Ghent. Usually, the winner of the WSAward of Composer of the Year is invited to the ceremony's next edition to perform a concert with his music.

Seminars for and with film music professionals, colloquia and concerts are also being organized next to the gala evening. There are also CD releases (with live concerts by Hans Zimmer, George Fenton and Georges Delerue) and the book Moving Music (by Lannoo - Tielt) that was published in 2005, in response to 20 years of film music at the film festival. In 2007, the CD series For the Record was launched, to shed light on the works of composers who had already performed at the festival. Hitherto, this series is made up of CDs by Craig Armstrong (2007), Mychael Danna (2008), Angelo Badalamenti (2009), Shigeru Umebayashi (2010), Gabriel Yared (2011) and Cliff Martinez (2014).

The festival is praised as one of the first cultural organizations to turn the spotlight on film music, which gave it the status of a pioneer. It has built up a strong reputation by organizing concerts, such as the very first concert of music by Hans Zimmer.

Honors

2022 
 Film Composer of the Year: Jonny Greenwood (Power of the Dog, Spencer)
 Television Composer of the Year: Nicholas Britell (Succession)
 Best Original Song:  No Time to Die No Time to Die (Billie Eilish, Finneas O'Connell, Steph Jones, Jordan Powers & Taura Stinson)
 Discovery of the Year: Eiko Ishibashi (Drive My Car)
 Public Choice Award: Joseph Metcalfe, John Coda, Grant Kirkhope (The King’s Daughter)
 SABAM Award for the Best Original Composition by a Young International Composer: Giacomo Rita
 Best Original Score for a Belgian Production: The Penelopes for the movie SpaceBoy
 Lifetime Achievement Award: Bruno Coulais
 WSA Industry Award: Catherine Joy for Alliance for Women Film Composers

2021 
 Film Composer of the Year: Daniel Pemberton (Rising Phoenix, Enola Holmes & The Trial of the Chicago 7)
 Television Composer of the Year: Carlos Rafael Rivera (The Queen’s Gambit & Hacks - Season 1)
 Best Original Song: "Call me Cruella” from Disney’s Cruella (Nicholas Britell, Florence Welch, Steph Jones, Jordan Powers & Taura Stinson)
 Discovery of the Year: Nainita Desai (The Reason I Jump)
 Public Choice Award: Benji Merrison (SAS: Red Notice)
 Lifetime Achievement Award: Eleni Karaindrou
 SABAM Award for the Best Original Composition by a Young International Composer: Dougal Kemp

2020 

 Film Composer of the Year: Hildur Guðnadóttir for Joker
 Television Composer of the Year: Nicholas Britell for Succession
 Best Original Song Written Directly for a Film: "Stand Up" from Harriet (written by Joshuah Brian Campbell, Cynthia Erivo and performed by Cynthia Erivo)
 Discovery of the Year: Bryce Dessner for The Two Popes
 Best Original Score for a Belgian Production: Torpedo by Hannes De Maeyer
 Public Choice Award: Klaus (Alfonso González Aguilar)
 Lifetime Achievement Award: Gabriel Yared
 SABAM Award for the Most Original Composition by a Young International Composer: Ana Kasrashvili

2019 

 Film Composer of the Year: Nicholas Britell for If Beale Street Could Talk, Vice
 Television Composer of the Year: Hildur Guðnadóttir for Chernobyl, Ófærð (Trapped)
 Best Original Song Written Directly for a Film: "Shallow" from A Star is Born (written by Lady Gaga, Andrew Wyatt, Anthony Rossomando, Mark Ronson, and performed by Lady Gaga and Bradley Cooper)
 Discovery of the Year: Michael Abels for Us
 Best Original Score for a Belgian Production: Duelles (Mothers' Instinct) by Frédéric Vercheval
 Public Choice Award: How to Train Your Dragon: The Hidden World (John Powell)
 Lifetime Achievement Award: Krzysztof Penderecki and Frédéric Devreese
 SABAM Award for the Most Original Composition by a Young International Composer: Pierre Charles

2018 
 Film Composer of the Year: Jóhann Jóhannsson for Last and First Men, Mandy, Mary Magdalene (co-composed with Hildur Guðnadóttir), The Butcher, The Whore and the One-Eyed Man, and The Mercy
 Television Composer of the Year: Ramin Djawadi for Game of Thrones (Season 7), The Strain (Season 4), and Westworld (Season 2)
 Best Original Song Written Directly for a Film: "Black Panther" from Black Panther (Kendrick Duckworth, Mark Spears, Kevin Gomringer, Tim Gomringer and Matt Schaeffer)
 Discovery of the Year: Tamar-kali for Mudbound
 Best Original Score for a Belgian Production: Zagros by Rutger Reinders
 Public Choice Award: Nostalgia (Laurent Eyquem)
 Lifetime Achievement Award: Philippe Sarde
 SABAM Award For the Most Original Composition by a Young International Composer: Logan Nelson

2017 
 Film Composer of the Year: Jóhann Jóhannsson for Arrival
 Television Composer of the Year: Rupert Gregson-Williams for The Crown
 Best Original Song Written Directly for a Film: "City of Stars" from La La Land (Justin Hurwitz)
 Discovery of the Year: Nicholas Britell for Moonlight
 Best Original Score for a Belgian Production: Sprakeloos by Jef Neve (film of Hilde Van Mieghem)
 Public Choice Award: Viceroy's House (A.R. Rahman) 
 Lifetime Achievement Award: David Shire
 SABAM Award For the Most Original Composition by a Young International Composer: Gavin Brivik

2016 
 Film Composer of the Year: Carter Burwell for Carol
 Television Composer of the Year: Jeff Beal for House of Cards
 Best Original Song Written Directly for a Film: "None of Them Are You" from Anomalisa (Charlie Kaufman and Carter Burwell)
 Discovery of the Year: Joe Kraemer for Mission: Impossible – Rogue Nation
 Best Original Score for a Belgian Production: Cafard by Hans Helewaut
 Public Choice Award: Carol (Carter Burwell)
 Lifetime Achievement Award: Ryuichi Sakamoto
 SABAM Award For the Most Original Composition by a Young International Composer: Sándor Török

2015 
 Film Composer of the Year: Michael Giacchino for Dawn of the Planet of the Apes, Inside Out, Jupiter Ascending, Jurassic World, and Tomorrowland
 Best Original Film Score of the Year: Birdman (Antonio Sánchez)
 Best Original Song Written Directly for a Film: "The Apology Song" from The Book of Life (Paul Williams and Gustavo Santaolalla)
 Discovery of the Year: Antonio Sánchez for Birdman
 Public Choice Award: The Maze Runner (John Paesano)
 Lifetime Achievement Award: Patrick Doyle
 SABAM Award For the Most Original Composition by a Young International Composer: Peer Kleinschmidt

2014 
 Film Composer of the Year: Alexandre Desplat for The Grand Budapest Hotel, Godzilla, The Monuments Men, Venus in Fur, Philomena, Zulu, and Marius
 Best Original Film Score of the Year: The Grand Budapest Hotel (Alexandre Desplat)
 Best Original Song Written Directly for a Film: "Happy" from Despicable Me 2 (Pharrell Williams)
 Discovery of the Year: Daniel Pemberton for Cuban Fury, The Counselor
 Public Choice Award: Marina (Michelino Bisceglia)
 Lifetime Achievement Award: Francis Lai
 SABAM Award For the Most Original Composition by a Young International Composer: Cyril Molesti

2013 
 Film Composer of the Year: Mychael Danna
 Best Original Film Score of the Year: Life of Pi (Mychael Danna)
 Best Original Song Written Directly for a Film: "Skyfall" from Skyfall (Adele)
 Discovery of the Year: Dan Romer and Benh Zeitlin
 Public Choice Award: The Butterfly's Dream (Rahman Altin)
 Lifetime Achievement Award: Riz Ortolani
 SABAM Award For the Most Original Composition by a Young International Composer: Gilles Alonzo

2012 
 Film Composer of the Year: Alberto Iglesias for Le Moine
 Best Original Film Score of the Year: Tinker, Tailor, Soldier, Spy (Alberto Iglesias)
 Best Original Song Written Directly for a Film: "Lay Your Head Down" from Albert Nobbs (Brian Byrne and Glenn Close)
 Discovery of the Year: Brian Byrne for Albert Nobbs
 Public Choice Award: W.E. (Abel Korzeniowski)
 Lifetime Achievement Award: Pino Donaggio
 SABAM Award For the Most Original Composition by a Young International Composer: Valentin Hadjadj

2011 
 Film Composer of the Year: Alexandre Desplat for A Better Life
 Best Original Film Score of the Year: Inception (Hans Zimmer)
 Best Original Song Written Directly for a Film: "We Belong Together" from Toy Story 3 (Randy Newman)
 Discovery of the Year: Alex Heffes for The First Grader
 Public Choice Award: 127 Hours (A. R. Rahman)
 Lifetime Achievement Award: Giorgio Moroder
 SABAM Award For the Most Original Composition by a Young International Composer: Gabriel Heinrich

2010 
 Film Composer of the Year: Alexandre Desplat for Julie & Julia
 Best Original Film Score of the Year: Fantastic Mr. Fox (Alexandre Desplat)
 Best Original Song Written Directly for a Film: "The Weary Kind" from Crazy Heart (Ryan Bingham and T-Bone Burnett)
 Discovery of the Year: Abel Korzeniowski for A Single Man
 Public Choice Award: A Single Man (Abel Korzeniowski)
 Lifetime Achievement Award: John Barry
 SABAM Award For the Most Original Composition by a Young International Composer: Karzan Mahmood

2009 
 Film Composer of the Year: Alexandre Desplat
 Best Original Film Score of the Year: The Curious Case of Benjamin Button (Alexandre Desplat)
 Best Original Song Written Directly for a Film: "Jai Ho" from Slumdog Millionaire (A. R. Rahman)
 Discovery of the Year: Nico Muhly for The Reader
 Public Choice Award: Twilight (Carter Burwell)
 Lifetime Achievement Award: Marvin Hamlisch
 SABAM Award For the Most Original Composition by a Young International Composer: Christopher Slaski

2008 
 Film Composer of the Year: James Newton Howard for Charlie Wilson's War
 Best Original Film Score of the Year: Atonement (Dario Marianelli)
 Best Original Song Written Directly for a Film: "Down to Earth" from WALL-E (Peter Gabriel and Thomas Newman)
 Discovery of the Year: Marc Streitenfeld for American Gangster
 Public Choice Award: Aanrijding in Moscow (Tuur Florizoone)
 Lifetime Achievement Award: Angelo Badalamenti
 SABAM Award For the Most Original Composition by a Young International Composer: Cedric Murrath

2007 
 Film Composer of the Year: Alexandre Desplat for The Queen
 Best Original Film Score of the Year: The Fountain (Clint Mansell)
 Best Original Song Written Directly for a Film: "You Know My Name" from Casino Royale (Chris Cornell and David Arnold)
 Discovery of the Year: Daniel Tarrab and Andres Goldstein
 Public Choice Award: The Fountain (Clint Mansell)
 Lifetime Achievement Award: Mikis Theodorakis
 SABAM Award For the Most Original Composition by a Young International Composer: Werner Viaene

2006 
 Film Composer of the Year: Alberto Iglesias
 Best Original Film Score of the Year: The Constant Gardener (Alberto Iglesias)
 Best Original Song Written Directly for a Film: "Our Town" from Cars (Randy Newman)
 Discovery of the Year: Evanthia Reboutsika for My Father and My Son
 Public Choice Award: Brokeback Mountain (Gustavo Santaolalla)
 Lifetime Achievement Award: Peer Raben
 SABAM Award For the Most Original Composition by a Young International Composerr: Alexis Koustoulidis

2005 
 Film Composer of the Year: Angelo Badalamenti for Un long dimanche de fiançailles
 Best Original Film Score of the Year: War of the Worlds (John Williams)
 Best Original Song Written Directly for a Film: "Old Habits Die Hard" from Alfie (Dave Stewart and Mick Jagger)
 Discovery of the Year: Michael Giacchino for The Incredibles
 Public Choice Award: Alexander (Vangelis)
 Lifetime Achievement Award: Jerry Leiber and Mike Stoller
 SABAM Award For the Most Original Composition by a Young International Composer: Hannes De Maeyer

2004 
 Film Composer of the Year: Gabriel Yared
 Best Original Film Score of the Year: Cold Mountain (Gabriel Yared)
 Best Original Song Written Directly for a Film: "You Will Be My Ain True Love" from Cold Mountain (Alison Krauss and Sting)
 Discovery of the Year: Gustavo Santaolalla for 21 Grams
 Public Choice Award: Harry Potter and the Prisoner of Azkaban (John Williams)
 Lifetime Achievement Award: Alan Bergman and Marilyn Bergman
 SABAM Award For the Most Original Composition by a Young International Composer: Steven Prengels

2003 
 Film Composer of the Year: Elliot Goldenthal
 Best Original Film Score of the Year: Frida (Elliot Goldenthal)
 Best Original Song Written Directly for a Film: "The Hands That Built America" from Gangs of New York (William Orbit)
 Discovery of the Year: Antonio Pinto for Cidade de Deus
 Public Choice Award: The Lord of the Rings: The Two Towers (Howard Shore)
 Lifetime Achievement Award: Maurice Jarre
 SABAM Award For the Most Original Composition by a Young International Composer: Michael Vancraeynest

2002 
 Film Composer of the Year: Patrick Doyle for Gosford Park
 Best Original Film Score of the Year: The Lord of the Rings: The Fellowship of the Ring (Howard Shore)
 Best Original Song Written Directly for a Film: "If I Didn't Have You" from Monsters, Inc. (Randy Newman)
 Discovery of the Year: Klaus Badelt for The Time Machine
 Public Choice Award: The Lord of the Rings: The Fellowship of the Ring (Howard Shore)
 Lifetime Achievement Award: George Martin
 SABAM Award For the Most Original Composition by a Young International Composer: Alex Otterlei

2001 
 Film Composer of the Year: John Williams for Artificial Intelligence: A.I.
 Best Original Film Score of the Year: Amélie (Yann Tiersen)
 Best Original Song Written Directly for a Film: "Come What May" from Moulin Rouge! (David Baerwald and Kevin Gilbert)
 Discovery of the Year: Craig Armstrong for Moulin Rouge!
 Public Choice Award: Artificial Intelligence: A.I. (John Williams)
 Lifetime Achievement Award: Elmer Bernstein

Film music concerts in Ghent 

 2015 WSA (Alan Silvestri, Daniel Pemberton), Great British Film Music
 2014 WSA (Cliff Martinez, Dan Romer, Francis Lai, Jef Neve), Charlie Chaplin's The Circus, Concert Nino Rota
 2013: WSA (Alexandre Desplat, Riz Ortolanoi), Scoring for Scorsese, The 7th Heaven Live by Kevin Toma, 40 Years of Film Fest Gent
 2012: WSA (James Newton Howard, Pino Donaggio), 007 in Concert, The B-Movie Orchestra, Ennio Morricone Concerto
 2011: WSA (Hans Zimmer, Elliot Goldenthal, Howard Shore, Giorgio Moroder), Maestros of Suspense (Bernard Herrman, Franz Waxman)
 2010: WSA (Angelo Badalamenti, Howard Shore, Gustavo Santaolalla, Stephen Warbeck, Craig Armstrong, Elliot Goldenthal), John Barry Tribute Concert, Koyaanisqatsi in Concert
 2009: WSA (Alexandre Desplat, Marvin Hamlisch, Marc Streitenfeld), Shigeru Umebayashi, Divine Féminin: Alexandre Desplat en het Traffic Quintet, Jef Neve
 2008: WSA (Dario Marianelli, Angelo Badalamenti, Tuur Florizoone), John Williams Tribute Concert, Folk Music in Film (Kadril), Clint Mansell in Concert, Gabriel Yared - A Tribute to Anthony Minghella
 2007: WSA (Mychael Danna, Evanthia Reboutsika, Harry Gregson-Williams), Alberto Iglesias in concert, Gustavo Santaolalla
 2006: WSA (John Powell, Michael Giacchino, Peer Raben), Craig Armstrong Film Works, Harry Potter Meets Wim Mertens (John Williams, Patrick Doyle, Wim Mertens)
 2005: WSA (Rachel Portman, Jerry Leiber en Mike Stoller, Gustavo Santaolalla), Polish Composers in Concert (Zbigniew Preisner, Wojciech Kilar, Jan A.P. Kaczmarek, Bronislau Kaper, Christopher Komeda e.a.)
 2004: WSA (Elmer Bernstein, David Raksin, Michael Kamen, Wim Mertens), Jerry Goldsmith Tribute Concert, The Lord of the Rings Symphony in Six Movements (Howard Shore)
 2003: WSA (Patrick Doyle en Hooverphonic), Raymond van het Groenewoud
 2002: WSA (Fenton-Delerue: A Film Music Celebration), As Time Goes By: Roby Lakatos, Jizo And Other Concert Works By Film Composers, Yann Tiersen in Concert
 2001: WSA (Gabriel Yared en Elmer Bernstein), Falling: The Concert featuring Praga Khan
 2000: Hans Zimmer Live in Concert, Ennio Morricone Live in Ghent
 1999: Film Music at the Opera (Stephen Warbeck, Jean-Claude Petit, Elliot Goldenthal en Frédéric Devreese)
 1998: The Birth of a Score II (Michael Kamen, Edward Shearmur, Loek Dikker, Dirk Brossé en Elmer Bernstein)
 1997: The Birth of a Score I (Dirk Brossé, Frédéric Devreese, Leonard Rosenman en Jean-Claude Petit)
 1995: Pietro Mascagni in Concert
 1994: A Tribute to Georges Delerue, Classical Music in Film II
 1993: A Tribute to Bernard Hermann, Classical Music in Film I
 1992: Music from Films by Derek Jarman (Simon Fisher Turner)
 1991: Michael Nyman in Concert
 1989: Film Music in Europe (Frédéric Devreese, Dirk Brossé, Nicola Piovani, Peer Raben, Stanley Myers en Lukas Karitinos)
 1988: A Night of Great Film Music (Frédéric Devreese, Georges Delerue, Bruce Broughton, David Newman en Jean-Claude Petit), Toots Thielemans Film Music Concert
 1987: A Night to Remember: Ennio Morricone
 1985: A Tribute to Nino Rota

References

External links
Official website

 
Belgian film awards
Belgian music awards
Film music awards
International music awards
Culture of Ghent